Digalloyl glucose may refer to:
 1,6-Digalloyl glucose, a gallotannin found in oak species
 2,6-digalloyl glucose and 3,6-digalloyl glucose, gallotannins found in galls of Tamarix aphylla

References